(5 January 1943 – 25 February 1993), known by her pen name , was a Japanese novelist.

She graduated from Japan Women's University. She was influenced by the Brothers Grimm, and wrote fairy tales. She mixes fantasy beings with contemporary settings.

Her work appeared in Mejiro jidō bungaku (Mejiro Children’s Literature).

Works 

 きつねの窓 (Kitsune no mado) The Fox’s Window: And Other Stories, translator, Toshiya Kamei, University of New Orleans Press, 2010. 
 “Hanamame no nieru made,” Until the Beans Are Cooked, 1993 
 "First Day of Snow", My Mother She Killed Me, My Father He Ate Me, Penguin Books, 2010.

References 

1943 births
1993 deaths
Japanese novelists